The Yaroslavl State Agricultural Academy (Yaroslavl SAA; , ЯГСХА) is a public high educational institution in Yaroslavl, Russia. It trains specialists for agricultural industry, as well as dog handlers, veterinarians, and landscape designers.

History 
In March 1944, the Yaroslavl Agricultural Institute was established on the basis of the Yaroslavl Agricultural College. Initially, the Yaroslavl SAI was located in the building of the city school No. 43. The first students of the institute were boys and girls from the villages, as well as veterans of the Great Patriotic War.

In August 1957, the Yaroslavl Agricultural Institute was transferred to Voroshilov (now - Ussuriysk), Primorsky Krai. Many teachers and students from Yaroslavl went to the Far East too. Now it's the Primorskaya State Agricultural Academy.

In April 1977, a branch of the Moscow Timiryazev Agricultural Academy was established in Yaroslavl. In December 1990, it was transformed into an independent Yaroslavl Agricultural Institute. In 1995, the institute achieved the status of academy.

Education 
Today, in the academy the education process is organized at three departments:
 Faculty of Veterinary and Animal Science,
 Faculty of Agricultural Technology,
 Faculty of Engineering.

References

External links 
  

Universities in Russia
Agricultural universities and colleges in Russia
Yaroslavl
Buildings and structures in Yaroslavl Oblast